Armen Hovhannisyan (born 7 March 2000) is an Armenian professional footballer who plays as a forward for Greek Super League 2 club Episkopi.

Career

Zemplín Michalovce
Hovhannisyan made his professional debut for Zemplín Michalovce against DAC Dunajská Streda on 24 May 2019. DAC had won the game 5–0. Hovhannisyan had replaced Sadam Sulley 56 minutes into the game, when the score was 4–0. Souleymane Kone had scored the final goal some 13 minutes after Armen's arrival.

He scored his first league goal for Zemplín on 30 November 2019, in a match against iClinic Sereď at neutral Stadium Myjava, in a 2:0 victory. Hovhannisyan came on as a stoppage time replacement for Modibo Sidibé, but managed to score a goal from a counter-attack set by Christos Kountouriotis. He managed to score again in the next round too, during a home match against Spartak Trnava. Hovhannisyan came on as a replacement for Sidibé once again, this time after the Nigerien striker suffered an injury in the 50th minute. In this match, Hovhannisyan scored following a pass by Peter Kolesár, sealing the score of the game for 2:0.

Episkopi
On 26 July 2022, Episkopi announced the signing of Hovhannisyan.

References

External links

Futbalnet profile

2000 births
Living people
Footballers from Yerevan
Armenian footballers
Association football forwards
Armenia youth international footballers
Armenian expatriate footballers
FC Ararat-Armenia players
Armenian First League players
MFK Zemplín Michalovce players
FC Nitra players
Slovak Super Liga players
Expatriate footballers in Slovakia
Armenian expatriate sportspeople in Slovakia